Mon île était le monde is a 1992 documentary film.

Synopsis 
A world born from the eyes of a poet. Jean Albany created his island, his feelings created his universe: The sea, the birds, the women, the flowers... gave him a language. He writes in Creole, uniting the roots of Réunion. Some of his works are Zamal, Miel vert, Bleu Mascarin, Bal indigo.

References 

1992 films
French documentary films
1992 documentary films
Documentary films about poets
1990s French films